Dopo was a Portuguese psych/freak folk band formed in late 2004 around Oporto, Portugal. 

Dopo began to record improvisations using many instruments, including toys, singing bowl and organs.

The first result of the many homemade recordings they have made is "Last Blues, To Be Read Someday", an EP released in December 2005 on Portuguese netlabel test tube.

January 2007 saw them releasing another record, "For the Entrance of the Sun", this time a full length, again on test tube and on CD-R label Lovers&Lollypops. 

"Crossing Birds" album (November 2007) was released on Foxglove.

Press quotes 

"There's something afoot in the sunkissed land of Portugal these days, but it mostly seems to be skimming under the radar. In a country best known for exporting wine and Cristiano Ronaldo, there's also a great deal of fantastic music being made on the edge of the Iberian peninsula. (...) I want to take a brief moment to highlight the band who I think is the best of the bunch. And with that, I give you Dopo". - Brad Rose, Foxy Digitalis, April 2007
 
"Assim como a nova improvisação “near silence” ganhou mais um centro nevrálgico em Portugal com músicos ou não-músicos como Ernesto Rodrigues, Carlos Santos, José Oliveira e Pedro Chambel, o rock neo-psicadélico, rock em reconciliação consigo mesmo (o que é verdade até nas situações em que a condição rock parece desaparecer), tem mais um nome a acrescentar a um painel onde já constam Loosers, Caveira e Frango, e esse nome é Dopo. É bom fixá-lo de uma vez por todas..." - Rui Eduardo Paes / Janeiro, 2007

"Here are eight tracks of magical, trance-inducing music, less composition than rituals, and each one of them keeps a meditative state at bay by summoning the power of that electrical charge." - Marc Weidenbaum / Janeiro, 2007

“Dopo are reminiscent of John Fahey and Boxhead Ensemble at their most blissfully meandering” - Marc Weidenbaum, Disquiet / December 23, 2005
 
“Je suis réellement retombé à la fin des années 60, à l'époque où Can expérimentait, où Amon Düül ne s'était pas encore démultiplié” - LaFresto / December 12, 2005

“Dopo is an oblique suggestion of stratospheric rock, an alien whisper, an Indian mantra, a bad rehearsed prayer, children playing in the garden, green tea and chocolate cookies at midnight. Dopo is love” - Nuno Catarino, A Forma do Jazz / December 14, 2005

“One of the most interesting and original of the unclassifiable Portuguese experimentalism (…). There is something very attractive in this imperfect and undone scratch that is very near to a state that invites us to shared ascesis” - Eduardo Chagas, Jazz e Arredores / January 28, 2006

Discography 
2007 - "Crossing Birds" (Album, Foxglove CD-R)
2007 - "For the Entrance of the Sun" (Album, digital release on test tube/CD-R on Lovers&Lollypops)
2005 – "Last Blues, To Be Read Someday" (EP, digital release on test tube/private press CD-R)

Portuguese musical groups